I Remember Everything, Richard is a 1966 film produced during Soviet period at the Riga Film Studio. Another name for the film is Rock and Splinters, which is normally applied to the uncut version.

The film's director was Rolands Kalniņš.

Plot
Synopsis in brief: Three friends — Jānis, Zigis and Ričards — are mobilized into the Latvian Legion during World War II, where they fight against the Red Army in the Volkhov Marshes. Zigis is killed while attempting to desert to the Soviets. Twenty years later the two surviving friends meet again. Jānis has stayed in Soviet Latvia and accepted the new order, while Ričards arrives from abroad, having become an agent to the Western powers hostile to the Soviet system.

While produced during the Soviet period and being full of Soviet propaganda clichés, the film rather objectively describes the events surrounding the participation of Latvian Legion in battles against Soviets on the Leningrad Front during World War II.

Cast
The film's cast included several notable Latvian actors: Eduards Pāvuls, Antra Liedskalniņa, Harijs Liepiņš, Pauls Butkēvičs, Uldis Pūcītis.

References

External links

 Akmens un šķembas on VHS - Gilde Film Studio
  (in Latvian)

1966 films
Latvian drama films
Soviet drama films
Films shot in Latvia
Films set in Latvia
Latvian-language films
Soviet-era Latvian films
Latvian Legion
Riga Film Studio films